National Highway 334C (NH 334C) is a  National Highway in India.

References

National highways in India